DGI (DGI, literally Danish Gymnastics and Sports Associations) is a Danish association of sports clubs which includes 6,600 local sports clubs and 1.6 million athletes. DGI was formed in November 1992 as a merger of "De Danske Gymnastik- og Ungdomsforeninger" (DDGU) and "De Danske Skytte-, Gymnastik- og Idrætsforeninger" (DDSG & I). Having had an association agreement for several years, De Danske Skytteforeninger (DDS) was also merged with DGI in January 2013.

DGI has traditionally had a much greater focus on recreational sports in contrast to the National Olympic Committee and Sports Confederation of Denmark, having Artistic gymnastics as their main business. Gradually, however, other sports such as badminton, football, handball and swimming also has grown into a sizable share.

References

Sports organizations of Denmark